Romulus and the Sabines (Italian: Il ratto delle sabine) is a 1945 Italian comedy film directed by Mario Bonnard and starring Totò, Carlo Campanini, and Clelia Matania. It was one of several of Totò's postwar comedies to use elements of neorealism.

The film is based on the German comedy Der Raub der Sabinerinnen (1884) by Franz von Schönthan and Paul von Schönthan.

Plot summary 
Toto is the actor of a penniless theater group: they arrive in a small town to offer their theatrical calendar to the mayor. Meanwhile, a professor: caught but shy, presents to the community his play, "The Rape of the Sabine Women", but the provincial inhabitants hate mortally the theater. The professor is in despair, but Toto willingly accepts the part of the work, just to eat something. At the end, the opera is performed at the theater, but it is a disaster, because the genre is drama, but Toto gullibility makes it a comic farce.

Cast
 Totò as Aristide Tromboni  
 Carlo Campanini as Maestro Ernesto Molmenti  
 Clelia Matania as Rosina  
 Laura Gore as Paolina  
 Olga Solbelli as Matilde  
 Luisa Alliani as Ermenegilda  
 Lia Corelli as Mariannina  
 Fosca Spadaro as La figlia di Tancredi  
 Aldo Silvani as Tancredi  
 Mario Pisu as Alberto Randoni  
 Giuseppe Rinaldi as Emilio  
 Claudio Ermelli as Germani  
 Mario Castellani as Il proprietario del teatro  
 Peppino Spadaro as Turiddu, il macchinista  
 Aristide Garbini as Bartolomeo  
 Ciro Berardi as Il brigadiere dei carabinieri  
 Italo Pirani as Il direttore della scuola  
 Erminio Spalla as Giovanni, il carrettiere

See also
 The Abduction of the Sabine Women (1928)
 The Abduction of the Sabine Women (1936)
 The Abduction of the Sabine Women (1954)

References

Bibliography
 Flavia Brizio-Skov. Popular Italian Cinema: Culture and Politics in a Postwar Society. I.B.Tauris, 2011.

External links

1945 films
1945 comedy films
Italian comedy films
1940s Italian-language films
Films directed by Mario Bonnard
Italian films based on plays
Italian remakes of foreign films
Remakes of German films
Films about theatre
Italian black-and-white films
Films with screenplays by Mario Amendola
1940s Italian films